The World Chess Boxing Organisation (WCBO) is the governing body of the sport chessboxing. The WCBO was founded by the late Iepe Rubingh, founder of the sport, in 2003 and has its headquarters in Berlin, Germany. Its current president is Montu Das from India.

The principal tasks of the WCBO include: training people in the number one thinking sport and the number one fighting sport and the combination of both; building up a worldwide structure of chess boxing clubs and organisations; promoting chess boxing; and holding championship and promotional fights.

Currently, affiliated chessboxing organisation with WCBO:
Chess Boxing Organisation of India
Turkey Chessboxing Federation
Italian Chessboxing Federation
France Chessboxing Federation
Russian Chessboxing Federation
Chile Chessboxing Association
Latvia Chessboxing Federation
Kazakhistan Chessboxing Federation
The Chess Boxing Club Berlin (founded in August 2005)
The Bulgarian Chess Boxing Organisation (founded in October 2005)

The WCBO's motto is: "Fighting is done in the ring and wars are waged on the board".

See also

Chess boxing
World Chessboxing Association
List of Chess boxing champions

References

External links
Chessboxing News Magazine Site

International sports organizations
Chess organizations
Chess boxing